Behind Prison Gates is a 1939 American crime film directed by Charles Barton and written by Arthur T. Horman and Leslie T. White. The film stars Brian Donlevy, Julie Bishop, Joseph Crehan, Paul Fix, George Lloyd and Dick Curtis. The film was released on July 28, 1939, by Columbia Pictures.

Plot
Detective Norman Craig takes the identity of dead bank robber Red Murray in order to go into prison without raising suspicions, he starts looking for three other bank robbers, but one day his partner is found dead in his cell and now Norman also has to find his partner's murderer.

Cast           
Brian Donlevy as Norman Craig / Red Murray
Julie Bishop as Sheila Murray 
Joseph Crehan as Warden O'Neil
Paul Fix as Petey Ryan
George Lloyd as Marty Conroy
Dick Curtis as Capt. Simmons
Richard Fiske as Lyman
Lester Dorr as Floyd

References

External links
 

1939 films
1930s English-language films
American crime films
1939 crime films
Columbia Pictures films
Films directed by Charles Barton
American black-and-white films
1930s American films